Rawatbhata is a city, Tehsil and Nagar Palika in Chittorgarh District, Rajasthan, India. It is 131 km from Chittorgarh city, 50 km from the nearest city, Kota. The city has eight nuclear power stations, an under-construction nuclear fuel complex, and a heavy water plant. Rawatbhata also has the biggest dam of Rajasthan, Rana Pratap Sagar Dam, which is built on the Chambal River. The dam is equipped with a 172 MW hydroelectric power station.

Rawatbhata Panchayat was promoted to Rawatbhata Municipality on 31st December 1997. Rawatbhata City is divided into 40 wards for which elections are held every 5 years. Rawatabhata Municipality has administration over 8,397 houses to which it supplies basic amenities like water and sewerage.

Geography
It has an average elevation of 325 metres (1066 feet).

Climate

Demographics

 India census, Rawatbhata had a population of 37,701. Males constituted 51.8% of the population and females 48.2%. Rawatbhata had a literacy rate of 85.82%, higher than the national literacy rate of 74.04%: Male literacy was 92.19%, and female literacy was 79.01%. In Rawatbhata, 12.27% of the population is under 6 years of age. The place is mainly dominated by Gurjars. In 1960s, due to the location of this remote place on Chambal river and least resistance by local tribal communities, this place was chosen for building nuclear power plant with support from Canadian-based AECL.

Schools

Private Schools

Schools include Shri Guru Teg Bahadur Shikshan Sansthan, Modern Public Senior Secondary School, New Dimension Public School, Shree Ram Bal Vidhya Mandir, St. Paul Secondary School, The Pinnacle School Badoliya, Royal Public School, Adarsh Vidhya Mandir School, and Alpha Secondary School.

Government Schools

Central Government
Atomic Energy Education Society  which has headquarters in Mumbai, runs 
 Atomic Energy Central School No.2 ( Classes Pre- Prep to 10th-CBSE-English Medium)
 Atomic Energy Central School No.3 (Classes Pre- Prep to 12th -Arts & Commerce CBSE) (Pre-Prep to VI – English Medium & VII to XII – Both Medium)
 Atomic Energy Central School No.4 (Classes Pre-Prep to 12th – Science CBSE- English Medium). 

AECS No. 4 is also very proud of Shreya Ghoshal as she is an alumnus of this school.

The AEES administrates all the AEC schools all over India where there are centres of Department of Atomic Energy.
These schools admit students whose parents are in the Department of Atomic Energy and other Central Government Departments as well as Non-DAE's but charge them higher fees.

State Government
There are two (1 boys & 1 girls)  Senior Secondary Schools, 
2 Secondary Schools, 2 Upper Primary Boys,
5 Primary Schools and 1 Sanskrit Secondary school.

Colleges

Government College. (B.A, B.Com & B.Sc)
Government Industrial Training Institute. (Fitter Welder & Electronics)
Shikhar Private ITI. (Electrician) 
Shradhalaya Janhati B.Ed College, (B.Ed & STC)
Shree Vishwakarma ITI Center. (Fitter & Electrician)

Hospitals
 Govt. Aayurvedic Hospital
 Lahoti Hospital
 RAPS Hospital
 RRVUNL Hospital
 Vimla Hospital

Post office

There are 3 post offices at Vikram Nagar, Anu Kiran & Bazar, and one Post Office franchisee at New Market.

Religious places

Shree Devnarayan Chauhan Gurjar Mandir
Shree Charbhuja Nath Mandir
Mukteshwer Mahadev Mandir
Shree Laxmi Narayan Mandir
Sai Baba Mandir
Ram Mandir
Manav Mandir
Hanuman Mandir
Sarvjanik Ganesh Manjir
Asha Pura Mandir
Durga Mata Mandir
Baba Ram Dev Ji Mandir
Shiv Mandir
Ganesh Mandir
Punch Mukhi Hanuman Mandir
Baroli Mandir
Brahma Mandir
Shani Dev Mandir
Digamber Jain Mandir
Shree Parshvanath Digamber Jain Mandir
Jain Sweatember Mandir
Jama Masjid
Madina Masjid
United Church
Gurudwara

Places of interest

Baroli Temple Complex

The Baroli Temples are located in Baroli Village in Rawatbhata. The complex of eight Temples is situated within a walled enclosure; an additional temple is about 1km away. They are built in the Gurjar Pratihar style of temple architecture dated to the tenth century A.D. All nine Temples are under the control of the Archaeological Survey of India for conservation and protection.

Rana Pratap Sagar Dam

Rana Pratap Sagar Dam on Chambal River is located near the city. The dam has power generation capability. It also supports a road connecting Rawatbhata to a nearby township，Vikram Nagar located on a small hill. On the top of the hill there is a large metal statue of Maharana Pratap, which is a view point over the city.

The Rana Pratap Sagar Dam is one among the four consequent dams constructed on the Chambal River which are Gandhi Sagar Dam, Rana Pratap Sagar Dam, Jawahar Sagar Dam and the Kota Barrage, the first three have electricity generation capacity while Kota Barrage is for irrigation.

The Rana Pratap Sagar Dam facilitates fishing activities in the nearby villages and is also responsible for supplying water to the Rajasthan Atomic Power Station for generation of electricity.

Bhainsrorgarh Wildlife Sanctuary
Bhainsrodgarh Wildlife Sanctuary is located at Saddle Dam Rawatbhata Chittorgarh. It has an area of 229.14 km2. The principle species are dhokra and khair. other species include babool, ber, salar, khirni etc. the fauna includes: panther, wild boar, chinkara, fox, four horned antelope, civet hyena, the sambhar,  the cheetal, chinkara, jackal, crocodiles etc. flora are dhok, salar, churel, butea. Many migratory birds are also spotted during the season.

Rajasthan Atomic Power Station

The Rajasthan Atomic Power Station is located at Rawatbhata. it currently has six pressurised heavy water reactor (PHWR) units operating with a total installed capacity of 1,180 MW.

The Nuclear Power Corporation of India Limited (NPCIL), the operator of the plant, is increasing the existing capacity by constructing two more reactors known as Units 7 and 8. (2×700MW=1400MW)

Heavy Water Plant
Owned and operated by the Department of Atomic Energy's (DAE) Heavy Water Board (HWB), the heavy water plant is integrated with the Rajasthan atomic power station for its supply of power and steam. An oil-fired steam generation plant was also added to ensure uninterrupted supply of steam during the shutdown periods. Canada began construction on the plant but ceased cooperation on the project after India's May 1974 test of a nuclear device. The Bhabha Atomic Research Centre(BARC) then completed designing the plant, which was originally expected to start operations in 1976. Problems associated with the accumulation of toxic chemicals created during the production of hydrogen sulphide gas, however, delayed commissioning until April 1985. These problems resulted in a cost escalation from 1.94 billion rupees to at least Rs. 7.2 billion rupees. Inadequate and unreliable supplies of power and steam from the RAPS reactors also plagued the plant and contributed to its low output. The two oil-fired boilers of the steam generation plant were added to alleviate the power supply problem. The heavy water plant uses the hydrogen sulphide water exchange process to produce up to 100mt of heavy water per year.

Nuclear Fuel Complex
Nuclear Fuel Complex, Hyderabad is setting up a green-field project Nuclear fuel Complex at Rawatbhata, Chittorgarh District, Rajasthan. This plant will meet the fuel requirements of 4 No 700 MWe PHWR reactors planned at Rawatbhata. The complex is spread over 190 hectares located on the banks of Rana Pratap Sagar, beside HWP-Rawatbhata. This plant is designed to produce 500 tonnes of 37 element PHWR fuel bundles per year. The project has received environmental clearance from MoEF (Ministry of Environment and Forest) in January 2014, financial clearance from the Union Cabinet in March 2014 with a sanctioned cost of INR 2,400 crores and siting clearance from AERB in May 2014, and construction work started in 2017

Kalakhet And R.A.P.S / H.W.P Colonies
The city of Rawatbhata is located in the lap of Aravali, surrounded by the forest.
RAPS/HWP Colony, is divided into Vikram Nagar Township, Anu Asha, Anu Bhagya, Anu Chhaya, Anu Kiran, Anu Pratap, Anu Deep Anu Tara, Santab Colony. 
There are all facilities; street lights, electricity, water, parks, community centres, schools, hostel, shopping complex, sports complex, playgrounds, Post Offices, banks, dispensary, etc.

There is a private farm house Kalakhet 35 minutes from Rawatbhata, with many gardens and entertainment places.
There are many types of trees and types of farming and a big swimming pool.  The facilities attract a considerable number of tourists in the rainy season.

Parajhar Waterfall

Parajhar is a nearby waterfall. The underground water flowing in caves has carved statues and figures on the stones in the cave.
Many people have died due accidents near the waterfall. It is near to village called Parajhar gaon. This place is also known for historic cave-temple of Lord Shiv. During Mahashivratri a large festival is organised here. water-fall and green surrounding is the attraction for peoples.

Saddle Dam

Saddle dam is a non-gated stone and mud dam to direct the water towards the main Rana pratap sagar dam and away from some villages, the catchment area of this dam fosters crocodiles and alligators.

References

External links

[https://www.facebook.com/RawatbhataOfficial/ Rawatbhata on Facebook

Cities and towns in Chittorgarh district
Company towns in India